Dabri is a residential colony in South West Delhi. It comes under Dwarka  Assembly constituency.

References

Master plan 2021

Neighbourhoods in Delhi
South West Delhi district